Boxer Ramen is a small chain of ramen restaurants in Portland, Oregon, United States. Micah Camden and Katie Poppe opened the original 30-seat restaurant in 2013, followed by a second in January 2015. Matt Lynch and Chris Thornton have since joined as partners. Boxer Ramen opened a third, fourth, and fifth location in March 2016, December 2017, and 2018, respectively. All of the restaurants closed temporarily in 2020 as a result of the COVID-19 pandemic; the two most recent closures have been converted into other restaurants operated in part by Camden.

Description
Boxer Ramen is a small chain of fast casual restaurants in Portland, Oregon. The original 30-seat ramen shop is located in Union Way, a multi-use retail "alleyway project" in the space formerly occupied by Red Cap Garage, in downtown Portland's West End. It has been described as a "sister restaurant" to Boxer Sushi, opened by Micah Camden in southeast Portland's Hawthorne district in 2012 and closed in September 2014.

Three additional locations have opened since 2013. Their interiors feature pop art decor. Portland Monthly said of the original location's atmosphere and interior: "Micah Camden's neo-pop noodle house looks like a ramen shop designed by Lucky Peach magazine. Wu-Tang Clan bumps from the sound system and an entire wall is clad in a mural of three cute but devilish Japanese girls hovering over a chicken, pig, or tuna leaping from a ramen bowl."

The restaurant on Albert Street features "utilitarian plywood decor" and umbrellas hanging from the ceiling, an alley spray-painted gold, and a mural described as "drawings of animal-people eating bowls of animal-people, like an anime episode of BoJack Horseman". Alexander Basek of Food & Wine said of the interior: "Boxer's generous use of hot pink and unfinished plywood for decor bestows Boxer's small interior with a work-in-progress vibe."

The original restaurant accepted cash only and did not offer take-out containers, as of 2013.

Menu
When it opened, Boxer Ramen's menu featured noodle soups with noodles made by Sun Noodle Company and two types of broth: spicy miso and tonkotsu-shoyu. Within a year, two additional ramen options were added: shiitake, featuring a mushroom-pork bone dashi, and vegetarian yellow curry, with coconut milk, corn, stock, and tofu. Other soup ingredients include pork belly, scallions, and soft poached eggs. Rotating side dishes included Japanese pickles, ohitashi spinach salads, okonomiyaki tater tots, pork belly buns and pot stickers. Mochi ice cream shipped from Bubbies in Honolulu is available for dessert; flavors include passion fruit. The fourth Boxer Ramen location added a bowl with short ribs to the menu, along with cocktails, including a Moscow mule and yuzu-infused gin and tonic.

History

Original restaurant

Micah Camden announced plans to open Boxer Ramen in April 2013. In August, he and co-owner Katie Poppe confirmed plans to open in late September, but there were some delays while the restaurant offered "soft openings" and "test dinners". October 9 was later announced as the opening date, but this was pushed back to November 1. Boxer Ramen hosted a "ramen free-for-all" on October 31, offering guests bowls at no cost from noon to 3:00 pm. The restaurant celebrated its first anniversary by offering half-price bowls from noon to 9:00 pm on November 1, 2014.

Subsequent locations
Boxer Ramen opened a second location in northeast Portland's Alberta Arts District, at the intersection of 21st Avenue and Albert Street, in January 2015. Camden and Poppe had applied for a liquor license by November 2014. The opening kicked off with a ramen bowl giveaway on January 22, and the restaurant initially operated from noon to 10:00 pm. It closed at 9:00 pm on all evenings, as of 2016.

The soft launch for the third restaurant, housed in a space previously occupied by the Two Tarts Bakery at the intersection of Northwest 23rd Avenue and Kearney Street, in the city's Northwest District, was held on March 25, 2016. Camden and Poppe had applied for a liquor license for the restaurant by November 2015, and were joined by new co-owner Matt Lynch. Similar to the promotional giveaway for the original location, Boxer Ramen offered free ramen bowls on site from 4:00 pm–7:00 pm. The Northwest District restaurant has a 28-seat dining area with an additional 8-seat counter. It offers a similar menu as the first two locations, operating from noon–9:00 pm on weekdays and from 11:00 am to 9:00 pm on weekends, as of 2016.

The trio opened a fourth location along East Burnside Street on December 1, 2017, slightly later than the previously announced opening date of October 15. Boxer Ramen hosted a similar on-site ramen giveaway on November 30. The 40-seat restaurant had a slightly expanded menu, cocktails, and happy hour from 10:00 m to midnight on Thursdays, Fridays, and Saturdays. The restaurant was the largest of the Boxer Ramen locations.

Plans for a fifth location in the Westmoreland, district of southeast Portland's Sellwood-Moreland neighborhood were confirmed in 2018. In January 2018, Portland Mercury said construction had recently begun on the 32-seat restaurant and anticipated a start by the summer season.

Boxer Ramen supported Family Meal, a nonprofit organization supporting "food service and agricultural workers in need in a medical debt crisis", as of 2019. In addition to Camden, Poppe, and Lynch, Chris Thornton was named a co-owner of Boxer Ramen in 2020.

COVID-19 pandemic

When the COVID-19 pandemic prompted Governor Kate Brown to close indoor dining, Camden gave teams at all restaurants the choice of temporary closure or continuing as a take-out service. The Boxer Ramen teams elected to pause operations altogether. In September 2020, Camden said of the closures: "Boxer Ramen has always been one of my favorite restaurants. I have five locations. But nobody in the world orders ramen to go."

The Burnside location had closed by August, and was converted into Rock Paper Fish, a seafood chain by Camden, Craig Peterson, and Ndamukong Suh. By July, the Sellwood restaurant was converted into a second location for Baes Fried Chicken, a fried chicken operation by Camden with Suh. Some Boxer Ramen staff continued to work at the satellite Baes, and new employees were hired as well.

Reception
Following the opening of the original restaurant, Michael Russell of The Oregonian gave Boxer Ramen a "B" rating and called the restaurant a "small step forward" for the city's ramen scene. He described the tonkotsu broth as "a salty Japanese carbonara" and deemed the dish Portland's best ramen. Russell also called the okonomiyaki tater tots a "cross-cultural stroke of genius". Willamette Weeks Martin Cizmar said Boxer Ramen "delivers quick, hard jabs" and called the restaurant Camden's "greatest creation yet" (in addition to Boxer Sushi, his other projects have included Blue Star Donuts and Little Big Burger). Portland Monthly said the spicy red miso ramen "has addictive potential" and recommends the passion fruit mochi, described as "creamy and softly fruity, a Dreamsicle reborn".

The Oregonians Samantha Bakall wrote, "The hip, Southwest Portland ramen-ya is known for its tonkotsu broth, arguably the best in Portland right now. Boxer was one of our favorite ramen shops of 2014." She also included Boxer Ramen in her 2014 list of "50 great Portland-area restaurants where you and a friend can chow down -- and maybe even have a drink -- for under $50". In his review, Ben Waterhouse recommended the pork-bone, shoyu, and tonkotsu broths, and wrote, "nowhere in town offers a bowl more like that you're likely to find after a long night of drinking in Shibuya".

Chris Onstad of the Portland Mercury recommended the tonkotsu-shio ramen in his 2014 review, and complimented the service staff describing as "quick, remarkably knowledgable, and friendly to the point of actual charm". He did, however, criticize the restaurant for accepting cash only, and wrote, "It is claimed the noodles are brought in from a vaunted purveyor, but I would still like them to be a little more toothsome when first set down. If the same noodle is going to be used in all four dishes, as it is here, it deserves finer tuning. Quantity-wise, I always felt like I ran out three bites shy of satisfaction."

In 2016, Willamette Week staff recommended the Northwest District restaurant during neighborhood visits, and Aaron Mesh questioned the Alberta restaurant's relatively early closing time. He wrote, "The puzzling part of a high-gloss take on the Tokyo ramen counter is that it closes at 9 pm. The starter menu ... would be impossibly popular at last call." Furthermore, he opined, "Camden's little big touches remain deft, even as he makes Portland look increasingly like a cartoon." The newspaper's Elise Herron ranked Boxer Ramen number six in her 2019 list of the "seven best places to get tots" in Portland, and wrote, "Seafood lovers will appreciate the fish flake-topped tots with sides of tonkatsu and creamy-spicy sauce." Boxer Ramen won in the "best ramen" category in Willamette Week 2016 "Best of Portland Readers' Poll", and was runner-up in 2017 and 2020. Portland Mercury Jenni Moore wrote in 2019, "Boxer Ramen's cool little space on Alberta has purposely exposed-but-glossed-over plywood walls, some pleasant mural art, and an only slightly alarming taxidermy raccoon riding in a canoe... They get extra points for bumping rap from the likes of Big K.R.I.T. and 2Pac, because yes, hip-hop does make my plant-based ramen more enjoyable."

Fodor's has described the original location as "often crowded and convivial", and Thrillist said: "This place is all about creating a dish, executing it well, and selling it for a decent price in a good environment. Nestled at the front end of Union Way plaza, this place has been the best place to get ramen in Downtown since its opening, and a great place to stop for post-shopping lunch." Zagat gives Delta ratings of 4.0 for food, 3.9 for decor, and 4.0 for service, each on a scale of 5. The guide said, "Fans find extreme umami at these no-nonsense Japanese from Micah Camden ... that offer a simple menu of great, rich ramen plus a few side dishes; the compact spaces are not a place to go with groups, but speedy, solicitous service ensures a noodle-icious experience that hits the spot."

See also
 List of Japanese restaurants
 List of noodle restaurants

References

External links

 
 

2013 establishments in Oregon
Japanese restaurants in Portland, Oregon
Ramen shops
Restaurants established in 2013